Makongolosi is an administrative ward in the Chunya district of the Mbeya Region of Tanzania. In 2016 the Tanzania National Bureau of Statistics report there were 12,442 people in the ward, from 18,116 in 2012.

Villages / vitongoji 
The ward has 14 vitongoji.

 Kalungu
 Kilombero
 Machinjioni
 Makongolosi
 Manyanya
 Mkuyuni
 Mpogoloni
 Mwaoga Kati
 Sokoni
 Songambele
 TRM
 Tankini
 Umoja
 Zahanati

References 

Wards of Mbeya Region